Mangalore is the chief port city of the Indian state of Karnataka.

Mangalore may also refer to:

Places
related to the city of Mangalore:
 Mangalore taluk
 Mangalore Central railway station
 Mangalore Junction railway station
 Mangalore University
 Mangalore, Bagalkot, a village in Badami taluka, Karnataka
 Mangalore, Victoria, a town in Australia
 Mangalore, Tasmania, a rural locality in Australia

Constituencies
 Mangalore (Lok Sabha constituency)
 Mangalore (Vidhana Sabha constituency)
 Mangalore (state assembly constituency)

Other uses
 Mangalores, a fictional alien race in The Fifth Element
 Mangalore Anantha Pai (born 1931), power engineer and academic 
 Mangalore Gopal Kini (died 1952), orthopedic surgeon
 Mangalore (1811 ship), a country ship

See also
 Mangalore tiles
 Mangaloreans
 Mangalorean Catholics
 Manglaur, town in Uttarakhand, India